Riboswitch_s0670 is a probable SAM riboswitch identified by RNA deep sequencing of Clostridioides difficile 630. Close matches are found with members of the SAM-I-IV-variant family, however s0670 and several sequences in this alignment do not match any Rfam family. Downstream genes are either S-adenosylmethionine synthetase (most frequently), S-ribosylhomocysteine lyase, O-acetylhomoserine (thiol)-lyase O-acetylhomoserine sulfhydrylase, homoserine dehydrogenase.

References

External links
 

Riboswitch
Cis-regulatory RNA elements